The British Open Squash Championships is the oldest tournament in the game of squash. It is widely considered to be one of the two most prestigious tournaments in the game, alongside the World Squash Championships (prior to the establishment of the World Squash Championships which was called the World Open at the time) in the 1970s, the British Open was generally considered to be the de facto world championship of the sport. The British Open Squash Championships are often referred to as being the "Wimbledon of Squash".

History 
While there had been a professional men's championship for some years, the 'open' men's championship (for both professionals and amateurs) was not inaugurated until 1930. Charles Read, British professional champion for many years, was designated the first open title holder. Would-be challengers were required to demonstrate they were capable of mounting a competent challenge as well as guaranteeing a minimum 'purse' (prize money) of £100 (which comprised gate-takings and players' 'subscriptions'). Read subsequently played the first final as the 'defending champion' against challenger Don Butcher in December 1930, but lost in home and away legs. The men's Championship maintained this 'challenge' system format until 1947, replacing it with the current 'knockout' system in 1948.

The women's championships commenced in 1922 as an amateur event and remained so until 1974. In the inaugural event, Joyce Cave defeated her sister Nancy Cave in the final.

Both Championships have been played continuously since inception, with the exception of the men's championship in 1934 (when no challenger to F.D. Amr Bey emerged), during World War 2 and 2010 and 2011 (latter years due to lack of sponsorship). The men's and women's events were originally held separately, but have been held as a joint event since 1983.

The most successful players in the history of the championships are Australian Heather McKay (née Blundell), who won the women's event 16 consecutive times from 1962 to 1977, and Pakistani Jahangir Khan, who won the men's title for 10 consecutive times from 1982 to 1991.

Venues 
The event has been held at various venues since the challenge system ended in 1947.
1948–1960 Lansdowne Club, London
1961–1962 Royal Automobile Club, London
1963–1968 Lansdowne Club and Royal Aero Club, London
1969, 1970–1974 Abbeydale Park, Sheffield
1970–1971 Edgbaston Priory, Birmingham
1975-1980+ Wembley Squash Centre, London
1980+, 1984–1994 Wembley Conference Centre
1981–1982 Churchill Theatre, Bromley
1983 Assembly Rooms, Derby
1984–1994 Wembley Conference Centre, London
1995–1997 Cardiff, Wales
1998, 2000, 2001 National Indoor Arena, Birmingham
1999 Aberdeen, Scotland
2002, 2005, 2007, 2009 National Squash Centre, Manchester
2003–2004 Albert Hall, Nottingham
2006 University of Nottingham, Nottingham
2008 Echo Arena, Liverpool
2012 The O2, London
2013 KC Stadium, Hull
2014–2022 Airco Arena, Hull
2023–present Edgbaston Priory Club and Birmingham Repertory Theatre, Birmingham
+ later rounds held at Conference Centre

Decline 
After being staged at the Wembley Conference Centre for 10 years until 1994 with some capacity crowds, the event began to move around Britain with eight different venues over the next 17 years – only twice staying in the same venue for consecutive years.

The competition suffered much uncertainty as it continued to move around the country. In 1999, the event was nearly dropped due to lack of sponsorship, but was saved by a last-minute deal. Promoter Alan Thatcher took the event to Aberdeen in conjunction with the newly-formed Eye Group. A crowd of 1,600 witnessed an astonishing final at Aberdeen Exhibition Centre, where local hero Peter Nicol collapsed at courtside with the score one game all against his great rival Jonathon Power and was rushed to hospital suffering from food poisoning.  A deal with Sky Sports was signed in 2000 to cover the event saw record prize money of £110,000 but by the following year it had moved again to Birmingham's National Indoor Arena.

Long term deals were agreed, but subsequently terminated early casting doubts over the staging of the event. A seven-year deal to play at the National Indoor Arena in Birmingham from 2000 was terminated after two. Fablon Investments cash injection over eight years was pulled in 2002 after less than two years. Promoters John Beddington and John Nimmick moved the Open to Nottingham but they ended their involvement in 2005, again after two years.

Shorter term agreements also began falling through, the Royal Horticultural Halls in London was announced as the venue for the 2005 British Open, but that agreement ended up scrapped with Manchester stepping in to host. Dunlop pulled out of their sponsorship in 2008, but the competition staggered on. The 2010 event was postponed as organisers tried to get the event moved back to London, but by the time the £200,000 headline sponsor withdrew their support the 2011 competition was also cancelled.

In May 2012, the competition returned with England Squash holding the British Open at The O2 with a new sponsor secured

Men's championship 

Note: 
1) From 1931 to 1947, the men's championship was decided by a best-of-three-matches contest between the defending champion and a single challenger (the third match was never required, as the ultimate champion won the first two matches on each of the occasions in which the final was played with this format). The championship has been played using a 'knockout' format since 1948.

2) Peter Nicol changed his nationality in 2001.

List of British Open Men's champions by number of victories

Men's champions by country

Women's championship

List of British Open Women's champions by number of victories

Women's champions by country

Records

See also 
 British Grand Prix (squash)
 British Junior Open Squash
 Official Men's Squash World Ranking
 Official Women's Squash World Ranking

References

External links 
 Official Allam British Open website

Squash tournaments in the United Kingdom
United Kingdom sport-related lists
International sports competitions hosted by the United Kingdom